The Roman Catholic Diocese of Alotau-Sideia is a Latin suffragan diocese in the ecclesiastical province of the Metropolitan Roman Catholic Archdiocese of Port Moresby, yet remains dependent on the Roman Congregation for the Missions Propaganda Fide.

Its cathedral episcopal see is the Cathedral of the Sacred Heart of Jesus, in Alotau, Milne Bay Province.

History 
 It was erected as the Prefecture Apostolic of Samarai on 13 June 1946, on territory split off from the then Apostolic Vicariate of Papua.
 Promoted on 11 November 1956 as Vicariate Apostolic of Samarai, hence entitled to a titular bishop.
 Promoted on 15 November 1966 as Diocese of Sideia, ceasing to be an exempt pre-diocesan mission.
 Its name was changed to the Diocese of Alotau-Sideia on 28 April 1975 (after the provincial capital transfer to Alotau).

Coat of arms 
The new coat of arms of the Diocese was adopted in 2016. The proposal of coat of arms created Marek Sobola, a heraldic specialist from Slovakia.

Ordinaries 
(all Roman Rite, so far missionary members of Latin congregations)

Apostolic Prefects of Samarai
Apostolic Administrator André Sorin, Sacred Heart Missionaries (M.S.C.) (1946.06.13 – 1951.05.18), Titular Bishop of Antiphræ (1946.06.13 – 1959.04.19), while Apostolic Vicar of Port Moresby (Papua New Guinea) (1946.06.13 – 1959.04.19)
 Francis John Doyle, M.S.C. (1951.05.18 – 1956.11.11 see below)Apostolic Vicar of Samarai 
 Francis John Doyle, M.S.C. (see above 1956.11.11 – 1966.11.15 see below), Titular Bishop of Onuphis (1956.11.11 – 1966.11.15)Diocesan Bishops of Sideia Francis John Doyle, M.S.C. (6.11.15 – 1970.03.07); emeritate as Titular Bishop of Árd Carna (1970.03.07 – 1973.11.04)
 Desmond Charles Moore, M.S.C. (1970.03.07 – 1975.04.28 see below)Diocesan Bishops of Alotau-Sideia Desmond Charles Moore, M.S.C. (see above'' 1975.04.28 – retired 2001.06.25)
 Francesco Panfilo, Salesians (S.D.B.) (2001.06.25 – 2010.03.18), also President of Bishops’ Conference of Papua New Guinea and Soloman Islands (2008.04 – 2011.05); later Coadjutor Archbishop of Rabaul (Papua New Guinea) (2010.03.18 – 2011.08.11) succeeding as Metropolitan Archbishop of Rabaul 2011.08.11 – ...)
 Roland Santos, Lazarists (C.M.) (2011.04.06 – ...)

References

Sources and external links
 GCatholic, with incumbent biography links

Alotau-Sideia